This was the first edition of the tournament.

Guido Andreozzi and Guillermo Durán won the title after defeating Luis David Martínez and Jeevan Nedunchezhiyan 6–4, 6–2 in the final.

Seeds

Draw

References

External links
 Main draw

Challenger Temuco - Doubles